The Greater Washington Board of Trade is a network of business and non-profit leaders in Washington, D.C. The Board of Trade invests in the cultural infrastructure of the area and promotes the construction and maintenance of public venues, including for professional sports, civic meetings, conventions, arts, and cultural events. The organization is composed of membership levels that range from "Business Member" to "Chairman's Council". Notable organizations and companies that are currently a part of the Board of Trade include KPMG, Hilton Hotels, The Washington Post, and the Calvert Group.

History
Before the creation of the Board of Trade, the  District of Columbia did not have a cohesive method of organizing and supporting its cultural infrastructure. Therefore, on November 27, 1889, the Greater Washington Board of Trade was founded after the local paper, The Washington Post, ran an advertisement. The board came into existence as a legal entity on December 2, 1889.

Known as the Board of Trade for the District of Columbia at the time of its creation, the organization was referred locally to as the Washington Board of Trade. During the 70th annual meeting on October 20, 1959, the organization welcomed its first female members when 188  businesswomen were added to the 7,200 total enrollment. The name of the organization was changed to the Metropolitan Washington Board of Trade. At the 90th annual meeting in 1979, the members approved a name change to the Greater Washington Board of Trade. During that meeting, the Board adopted the logo that is still being used today: three interlocking circles that symbolize the unity of Northern Virginia, the District of Columbia, and suburban Maryland.

On November 3, 1992, the Greater Washington Board of Trade challenged the Washington, D.C. law that required employers to provide their at-work employees health insurance to continue to offer the equivalent health insurance coverage for disabled employees who are eligible for workers compensation insurance. On December 14, 1992, the legal decision that the Supreme Court ruled was that states cannot require employers to provide disabled employees the same health insurance with they provide active employees.

The archives of the Greater Washington Board of Trade are housed in the Special Collections Research Center of the Estelle and Melvin Gelman Library at George Washington University.

References

External links
Board of Trade home page
A history of the Washington Board of Trade from the Center of History and New Media
Greater Washington Initiative Affiliated research and economic development marketing organization
Guide to the Greater Washington Board of Trade Records, 1889-1996, Special Collections Research Center, Estelle and Melvin Gelman Library, The George Washington University

Organizations based in Washington, D.C.
Organizations established in 1889
1889 establishments in Washington, D.C.